Ayazi syndrome (or Chromosome 21 Xq21 deletion syndrome) is a syndrome characterized by choroideremia, congenital deafness and obesity.

Signs and symptoms
The presentation for this condition is as follows:
 Mental retardation
 Deafness at birth
 Obesity
 Choroideremia
 Impaired vision
 Progressive degeneration of the choroid

Genetics 
Ayazi syndrome's inheritance pattern is described as x-linked recessive. Genes known to be deleted are CHM and POU3F4, both located on the Xq21 locus.

Diagnosis

Treatment

References

External links 

 

Genetic disorders with no OMIM
Congenital disorders
Syndromes affecting hearing
Syndromes with intellectual disability
Syndromes with obesity